Nectandra ramonensis is a species of plant in the family Lauraceae. It is found in Costa Rica and Panama.

References

ramonensis
Flora of Costa Rica
Flora of Panama
Taxonomy articles created by Polbot